Manchester Moss Side was a parliamentary constituency in the Moss Side area of the city of Manchester.  It returned one Member of Parliament (MP) to the House of Commons of the Parliament of the United Kingdom, elected by the first past the post system.

The constituency was created for the 1918 general election and abolished for the 1983 general election.

Boundaries 

1918–1950: The County Borough of Manchester wards of All Saints, Moss Side East, and St. Luke's.

1950–1974: The County Borough of Manchester wards of Chorlton-cum-Hardy, Moss Side East, and Moss Side West.

1974–1983: The County Borough of Manchester wards of Alexandra, Chorlton, Hulme, Lloyd Street, and Moss Side.

Members of Parliament

Election results

Elections in the 1910s

Elections in the 1920s

Elections in the 1930s

Elections in the 1940s 
General Election 1939–40

Another General Election was required to take place before the end of 1940. The political parties had been making preparations for an election to take place from 1939 and by the end of this year, the following candidates had been selected; 
Conservative: William Duckworth
Labour: William Griffiths

Elections in the 1950s

Elections in the 1960s

Elections in the 1970s

Note: This constituency underwent boundary changes after the 1970 election, so was notionally a Labour seat.

References 
Notes

Bibliography
 

Moss Side
Constituencies of the Parliament of the United Kingdom established in 1918
Constituencies of the Parliament of the United Kingdom disestablished in 1983